Massimo Murdocca (born 2 September 1984) is an Australian professional soccer player who plays as a right or central midfielder for National Premier Leagues club Nunawading City FC.

Club career
Before joining Brisbane Roar, Murdocca played for South Melbourne and Carlton SC in the now defunct National Soccer League, and for Fawkner Blues in the Victorian Premier League.

Murdocca had a hugely successful spell with the Roar, making 182 appearances and scoring four goals over eight seasons from 2005 to 2013.

After his release from Brisbane, Murdocca signed a two-year deal with Melbourne Heart. Murdocca played in all 27 games of the 2013–14 A-League season, as his side finished in bottom place. The following season, Murdocca's role was reduced, starting in just 7 games. Murdocca was released from the club at the end of the 2014–15 season.

In May 2015 Murdocca signed with Avondale. Murdocca made 11 appearances in the second half of the 2015 NPL Victoria season, scoring two goals as his side finished ninth.

In November 2015, Avondale confirmed that Murdocca had signed on for the 2016 NPL Victoria season. Murdocca made 24 appearances as Avondale finished one place higher than the 2015 season, in eighth.

Murdocca, made captain for the 2017 season, led Avondale to the club's first ever finals series, after making 27 appearances in their run to third place. However, Avondale went 2-1 down to Oakleigh Cannons FC in the elimination round. Murdocca was given the NPL Victoria Gold Medal at the end of season awards night.

On 26 October 2017 it was announced Massimo had signed for Nunawading City FC where former Melbourne Heart/City teammates Patrick Gerhardt & James Brown were already.

International career
Murdocca represented Australia in the 2003 FIFA World Youth Championship.

Playing style
Murdocca is widely known in the A-League for his high work rate and stamina.

Career statistics

Club

1 - includes A-League final series statistics
2 - includes FIFA Club World Cup statistics; AFC Champions League statistics are included in season ending during group stages (i.e. ACL 2012 and A-League 2011–12 seasons etc.)

Honors
Brisbane
 A-League Premiership: 2010–2011
 A-League Championship: 2010–2011, 2011–12

Notelist

References

External links
 Oz Football profile

1984 births
Living people
Soccer players from Melbourne
Australian people of Italian descent
Australian soccer players
South Melbourne FC players
Brisbane Roar FC players
Melbourne City FC players
Avondale FC players
A-League Men players
National Soccer League (Australia) players
National Premier Leagues players
People educated at Parade College
Association football midfielders
People from Carlton, Victoria
Australia youth international soccer players